Bengaluru FC Reserves and Academy, also known as Bengaluru FC B, is Bengaluru FC's most senior youth team, and also acting as a reserve team. It participates in Bangalore Super Division and Reliance Foundation Development League. Bengaluru FC Academy is the youth setup of Bengaluru FC. Its teams participate in Youth League, Junior League and Sub Junior League tournaments.

In July 2020, Asian Football Confederation conferred two-star Academy status to Bengaluru FC Academy, one of only two academies in India.

Reserves
In October 2017, Bengaluru FC announced 28-member squad, which would act as a reserve side called Bengaluru FC 'B', led by Naushad Moosa and would compete in I-League 2nd Division for 2017–18 season. Reserve team would also act as a bridge between the BFC Academy and the first team. Reserves team made their first appearance in the annual G.V. Raja football tournament in Thiruvananthapuram.

The reserves team participated in 2017–18 Bangalore Super Division and were placed fourth in the league, following the conclusion of the tournament, the team also participated in 2017–18 I-League 2nd Division and finished second in the group stage. Bengaluru FC 'B' won their first trophy under Naushad Moosa when they won 2018 Puttaiah Memorial Cup. The same season reserves team also won 2018–19 Bangalore Super Division for the first time, and remained undefeated with 7 wins and 1 draw in 2018–19 I-League 2nd Division.

Squad

Results

Team management

Coaches
 Naushad Moosa (2017–2022)
 Jan Van Loon (2022–present)

Academy
With the inception of Bengaluru FC in 2013, Bengaluru FC also started youth academy with the aim of "nurturing talent within the lower age groups with the possibility of creating players who are fit to represent the Blues’ first team." under Richard Hood as Head of Youth Development. Three years later in July 2016, Bengaluru FC started a residential academy at Vijaynagar, near Bellary under John Killa.

Under–18
Bengaluru FC youth team first participated in 2014 I-League U19, in Rest of India zone along with Hindustan, Aizawl, and Garhwal, where they placed second in the group stage and could not advance. In 2014–15 I-League U19 season, they were placed last in the group stage of Rest of India zone. In 2015–16 I-League U18, they were placed third in the group stage.
After the set up of residential academy, U18 team convincingly won their group in Rest of India zone in 2016–17 season defeating Ozone FC and Fateh Hyderabad, while remaining unbeaten.
 In final round the U18 team finished third in the group failed to advance to the semifinals.

Squad

Under–15
Bengaluru FC participated in the first ever U15 Youth League tournament and were placed in Rest of India II zone with Ozone FC,
Fateh Hyderabad, Boca Juniors FS, Kovalam FC, Mahogany FC. Bengaluru finished second behind Ozone to qualify for national finals. In final round Bengaluru U15 drawn into Group A along with United, Aizawl and Sporting Goa. Bengaluru U15 placed third in the group stage and failed to advance.
In 2016–17 season Under–16 team, playing in Rest of India zone (Goa) also won the group stage, winning all three games against Dempo, Salgaocar and Sporting Goa, however they lost to eventual champions, Minerva Punjab in the semifinals.

In 2017–18 season Under–15 team, won the Karnataka zone to qualify for national finals. In final round the team was clubbed with MSP FA, SAI Guwahati and FC Goa. Bengaluru topped the group and entered the semifinals, were they lost in penalty shoot-out to DSK Shivajians.

Notable alumni
In November 2016, Calvin Abhishek became the first academy graduate to be selected for the senior team. In August 2017 Bengaluru FC added two academy graduates, defender Prashanth Kalinga and forward Leon Augustine, to the squad for 2017 AFC Cup knockout rounds.

Soccer schools
In April 2014, the academy also started the initiative of Soccer schools to conduct summer camps, provide training and scout young talents. Soccer schools are currently operated at 5 locations in various parts of Bengaluru.

Coaches
 Richard Hood (2013–2015)
 John Killa (2015–2018)
 John Kenneth Raj (2018–present)

Results

See also
 Bengaluru FC Futsal

References

External links
 Official Website

Academy
2013 establishments in Karnataka
Youth League U18
Indian reserve football teams
Football academies in India
I-League 2nd Division clubs